The Department of Construction was an Australian government department that existed between December 1975 and December 1978.

Scope
Information about the department's functions and/or government funding allocation could be found in the Administrative Arrangements Orders, the annual Portfolio Budget Statements and in the Department's annual reports.

The functions of the Department at its creation were:
Planning, execution and maintenance of Australian Government works 
Design, provision and maintenance of furniture furnishings and fittings for the Australian Government.

Structure
The Department was a Commonwealth Public Service department, staffed by officials who were responsible to the Minister for Construction, John McLeay, Jr.

References

Construction
Ministries established in 1975